Kayunga Hospital, is a public hospital in Uganda.

Location
The coordinates of Kayunga Hospital are 0°42'12.0"N, 32°54'14.0"E (Latitude:0.703329; Longitude:32.903886).

Overview
Kayunga Hospital opened in 1973 during the reign of Idi Amin. It offers services to residents from Kayunga district and neighboring districts including Kamuli, Buikwe, Mukono, Luweero and Nakasongola.

According to a 2009 published report, Kayunga Hospital had a dilapidated and crumbling infrastructure, aging equipment and machinery, under-staffing, poor staff remuneration, overwhelming patient numbers, and under-funding.

Renovations and improvements
In 2016, the Government of Uganda secured loans from Middle Eastern lenders totaling USh70 billion (approx. US$19 million), to renovate the dilapidated hospital and equipment, as well as construct new staff housing. The renovations are funded by loans from the (a) Saudi Fund for Development, (b) Arab Bank for Economic Development in Africa (BADEA) and (c) OPEC Fund for International Development (OFID).

After delays, blamed on "bureaucracy within the Ministry of Health", the actual work started in early 2018.

The scope of the renovations include (1) a new Emergency Department (Casualty) (2) new operating rooms (theatres) (3) new out-patient department (4) new administration office block (5) expansion of the in-patient wards (6) new staff housing (7) rehabilitation of the water supply system (8) rehabilitation of the sewerage collection and disposal system.

The expansion and renovations are expected to conclude in 2020, with a total bed capacity of 300, and the conversion of Kayunga Hospital, to Kayunga Regional Referral Hospital. The main contractor is Arab Contractors Uganda Limited.

Regional Referral Hospital status
After renovations and expansion, then now 200-bed facility was upgraded to a Regional Referral Hospital, responsible for the districts of Buikwe,  Jinja, Kayunga,  Kamuli, Luweero,  Mukono and Nakasongola.

See also
Hospitals in Uganda

References

External links 
Kayunga doctor under fire over Museveni posters in hospital

Kayunga
Kayunga District
Central Region, Uganda
Hospital buildings completed in 1969
1969 establishments in Uganda